Alexander 134 is an Indian reserve of the Alexander First Nation in Alberta, located within Sturgeon County. In the 2016 Canadian Census, it recorded a population of 1,099 living in 272 of its 349 total private dwellings. The reserve has the name of Alexander Arcand, a tribal leader.

References

Indian reserves in Alberta
Cree reserves and territories